La Arena may refer to:
La Arena District, Peru
La Arena, Los Pozos District, Panama
La Arena, Chitré District, Panama

See also
San Juan de La Arena
Paso de la Arena